Marcelo Alejandro Teuber Coser (born 15 August 1984) is a Chilean former footballer who played as a midfielder. His last club was Curicó Unido.

Personal life
He is older brother of Samuel Teuber, who was a professional footballer during the 2000s.

Honours

Player
Provincial Osorno
 Primera B (1): 2007

References

External links
 
 

1984 births
Living people
People from El Loa Province
Chilean people of German descent
Chilean footballers
Puerto Montt footballers
Provincial Osorno footballers
Unión San Felipe footballers
Naval de Talcahuano footballers
Curicó Unido footballers
Tercera División de Chile players
Chilean Primera División players
Primera B de Chile players
Association football midfielders